The Arizona Wildcats are the athletic teams that represent the University of Arizona, located in Tucson. The Wildcats compete at the National Collegiate Athletic Association (NCAA) Division I (Football Bowl Subdivision (FBS) for college football) level as a member of the Pac-12 Conference. Arizona's chief intercollegiate rival is the Arizona State Sun Devils, and the two universities' athletic departments compete against each other in multiple sports via the State Farm Territorial Cup Series.

Athletic program
The University of Arizona participates in the NCAA's Division I-A in the Pac-12 Conference Arizona participates in the conference's South Division, along with Arizona State, Colorado, UCLA, USC, and Utah. Arizona joined the Pac-8 in 1978 along with Arizona State University, bringing the conference to 10 teams and the new name of the Pac-10 (the conference became the Pac-12 with the additions of Colorado and Utah in 2011). The school colors are cardinal red and navy blue since 1900, though originally sage green and silver. The official fight song is "Fight! Wildcats! Fight!", though "Bear Down, Arizona!" is more commonly used and "Bear Down" is the university's slogan.

History
The Wildcats name derived from a 1914 football game with then California champions Occidental College, where the Los Angeles Times asserted that Arizona "showed the fight of wildcats."
 The first sport to bring national recognition to UA was polo. The 1924 UA polo team captured the Western Collegiate Championship, and traveled to the east coast to present U.S. President Calvin Coolidge with a cowboy hat. The UA polo team faced Princeton University for the intercollegiate title and lost 6–2 and 8–0. With the onset of World War II, the UA was unable to continue sponsoring a polo team.

Mascot
 The university mascots are anthropomorphized wildcats named Wilbur and Wilma. The identities of Wilbur and Wilma are kept secret through the year as the mascots appear only in costume, except typically until the last home basketball game of the year. Then, at halftime, Wilbur and Wilma are exposed. In 1986, Wilbur and Wilma, a longtime couple, were married. Together, Wilbur and Wilma appear along with the cheerleading squad at most Wildcat sporting events.

Arizona's first mascot was a real desert bobcat named "Rufus Arizona", introduced in 1915 and named after the university's president at the time, Rufus B. von KleinSmid.

Rivalries
A strong athletic rivalry exists between the University of Arizona Wildcats and Arizona State University Sun Devils, the state's only two Division I-FBS teams. The rivalry has been recognized as one of the most bitter rivalries in college sports. Both schools compete in the State Farm Territorial Cup Series, a head-to-head competition in 18 different sports. The football rivalry, nicknamed "The Duel in the Desert," is the oldest rivalry game in college football that features a trophy. The trophy awarded after each football game is the Territorial Cup as the teams first played in 1899, while the Territory of Arizona was an organized incorporated territory of the United States.  The University of Arizona holds the all-time record in all 3 major men's sports. Starting with basketball they hold a record of 150–82 against ASU. They also hold the all-time record in football 49–40–1. Finally holding the all-time record in baseball 247–215–1.

Rivalries have also been created with other Pac-12 teams, especially University of California, Los Angeles which has been a consistent softball rival and was Arizona's main men's basketball rival from the late 1980s to the present.

Outside of the Pac-12, Arizona has two dormant rivalries with two other former Border Intercollegiate Athletic Association members, the New Mexico Lobos and Texas Tech Red Raiders. Although Arizona remained in the Border Conference until it folded in 1961, New Mexico and Texas Tech withdrew from the Border Conference in 1952 and 1956 respectively. Both football programs remained on Arizona's schedule annually until the late 1970s, even though Texas Tech was a member of the Southwest Conference and New Mexico was a member of the Skyline Eight. In 1962, Arizona and New Mexico once again became conference rivals as charter members of the Western Athletic Conference. The Kit Carson Rifle was a traveling trophy exchanged between the Wildcats and Lobos from 1938 though 1990. Prior to the 1997 Insight.com Bowl, two schools announced the Kit Carson Rifle would not be awarded to the bowl game's winner because the trophy may have been used against Native Americans.

Varsity sports

The University of Arizona sponsors teams in eight men's and twelve women's NCAA sanctioned sports.

Baseball

The baseball team is consistently one of the top teams in the country and has captured four national championship titles in 1976, 1980, 1986, and 2012. Arizona's baseball teams have appeared in the NCAA College World Series more than fifteen times. , the team is coached by Chip Hale.

Men's basketball

The men's basketball team has been one of the nation's most successful programs since Lute Olson was hired as head coach in 1983 and was known as a national powerhouse in Division I men's basketball. From 1988 to 2007, the team amassed 20 consecutive 20-win seasons. Arizona reached the NCAA tournament in 25 consecutive years from 1985 to 2009. The Wildcats reached the Final Four of the NCAA tournament in 1988, 1994, 1997, and 2001.

In 1997, Arizona defeated the University of Kentucky, the defending national champions, to win the NCAA National Championship. Their championship team was led by future NBA players Mike Bibby and Michael Dickerson, as well as Final Four MVP Miles Simon. Bennett Davison and A. J. Bramlett rounded out the starting five. Other team members include Jason Terry, Eugene Edgerson and Josh Pastner. They defeated three number-one seeds in the same tournament: Kansas, North Carolina and Kentucky in the Championship Game. They won a thriller game in the Elite Eight in double overtime to take them to the Final Four.

After 25 years of coaching Arizona, Lute Olson retired shortly before the 2008–2009 season, largely due to on-going health issues. After several years of coaching by interim head coaches, Arizona named Sean Miller, formerly the head coach of Xavier, as the next Wildcats head coach. In the NCAA Tournament, Sean Miller led the Wildcats to 3 Elite Eight appearances (2011, 2014, 2015).

After 12 years at the helm, Arizona and head coach Sean Miller parted ways. In April 2021, it was announced that Tommy Lloyd, the longtime top assistant coach at Gonzaga under Mark Few, would become the next head coach of Arizona men's basketball.

Women's basketball

The women's basketball program began in its current form in 1972. Before that, it existed as an intramural sport. The team has twice been runner-up in the Pac-10 (forerunner of the Pac-12) Conference Tournament and has made seven appearances in NCAA tournaments, and gone abroad to play in four foreign countries. The program has had eight coaches in its forty-plus years and as of the onset of the 2015–2016 season, and all-time game record of 537–642.

Football

The football team began at the University of Arizona in 1899 under the nickname "Varsity" (a name kept until the 1914 season when the team earned the name "Wildcats"). The football team was notably successful in the 1990s under head coach Dick Tomey and his "Desert Swarm" defense that was characterized by tough, hard-nosed tactics. In 1993, the team had its first 10-win season and drubbed the powerhouse Miami Hurricanes in the Fiesta Bowl by a score of 29–0. In 1998, the team posted a school-record 12–1 season and made the Holiday Bowl in which it defeated the Nebraska Cornhuskers. Arizona ended that season ranked 3rd nationally and 2nd in several publications. Despite a stellar season, Arizona's single loss to UCLA caused the team to finish second in the Pac-10. From 1999 to 2007, Arizona had a mix of unsuccessful seasons without any bowl appearances. Then in 2008 Arizona returned to prominence with a successful season and a bowl win against BYU in the Las Vegas Bowl. Arizona has started to build up its old time success with a 6–2 record, and an appearance in the BCS standings ranked number 18. This is the first time they have been ranked in the BCS poll since 1998. After their win against Washington State, Arizona was bowl eligible for the third time in four years. After a win against USC, Arizona along with Nebraska was invited to the Pacific Life Holiday Bowl. It was the first time since 1998 that Arizona had played in the Holiday Bowl and the second time both schools have met each other at the bowl game. From November 2003 until October 2011, the program was led by Mike Stoops, brother of Bob Stoops, the head football coach at the University of Oklahoma (the 2000 BCS national champions); Stoops was fired on October 10, 2011.

Former Michigan and West Virginia head coach Rich Rodriguez was hired on November 21, 2011, to lead the Wildcats. The announcement was made by UA athletic director Greg Byrne via Twitter. In his first season, Rodriguez took the Wildcats to the 2012 New Mexico Bowl, where they defeated the University of Nevada Wolfpack. The Wildcats finished the 2012 campaign with an 8–5 (4–5 Pac-12) record. In his second season, Rodriguez took the Wildcats to the 2013 AdvoCare V100 Bowl, where they defeated Boston College. The Wildcats finished the 2013 campaign with a (8–5, 4–5 Pac-12) record. In 2014, Rich Rodriguez led the Wildcats to a 10–3 regular season, behind generally solid team performance, including efforts from freshman QB Anu Solomon, sophomore LB Scooby Wright (who earned Pac-12 Defensive Player of the Year among other honors), senior RB Terris Jones-Grigsby and freshman RB Nick Wilson. The Wildcats won the Pac-12 South Division, the first divisional championship in program history, advancing to the Pac-12 Football Championship Game at Levi's Stadium in Santa Clara, California, where they were defeated by the Oregon Ducks, 51–13. The Wildcats then played in the first College Football Playoff appearance, netting a berth in the 2014 Fiesta Bowl, the school's third major-bowl appearance, where they faced the Boise State Broncos. Arizona lost the game to Boise State, 38–30. The Wildcats finished the 2014 season with a record of 10–4 (7–2 Pac-12), achieving only the second 10-win regular season in program history; the Wildcats also finished the season ranked number 17 in the USA Today Coaches Poll and number 19 in the AP Poll.

Men's golf

The university's golf teams have also been notably successful. The men's team won a national championship in 1992.  Jim Furyk, the 2003 U.S. Open champion attended the University of Arizona prior to turning professional in 1992. The men's team has won three Pac-12 Conference championships (1987, 1991, 2004). Starting in 2023, the Arizona Men will use Tucson Country Club as their home course.

Women's golf

The women's team is one of the most successful in all of collegiate golf.  They have won three national championships in 1996, 2000, and 2018. Annika Sörenstam won an individual national title in 1991, and Lorena Ochoa was NCAA Women's Player of the Year in 2001 and 2002 before leaving UA early to turn pro. Erica Blasberg was the country's number 1 ranked college player as a freshman, compiling six victories before leaving in her sophomore year to turn pro, was an All-American golfer in 2003 and 2004, 2003 NCAA Freshman of the Year, 2003 Pac-10 Player of the Year and Freshman of the Year, and won the 2003 Golfstat Cup, awarded for having the NCAA women's lowest stroke average (72.36).

Softball

The Arizona softball program has arguably been the best college softball program over the last 20 years. The softball team has won eight NCAA Women's College World Series titles, in 1991, 1993, 1994, 1996, 1997, 2001, 2006 and 2007 under head coach Mike Candrea (NCAA Softball Championship). The team has appeared in the NCAA National Championship in 1991, 1992, 1993, 1994, 1995, 1996, 1997, 1998, 2001, 2002, 2006, 2007 and 2010, a feat second only to UCLA. Mike Candrea also led the 2004 U.S. Olympic softball team to a gold medal in Athens, Greece & 2008 led the team to a silver medal in Beijing, China.

Swimming
The women's and men's swimming & diving team won their first national championships in 2008.

In 2014–2015, women's team member Margo Geer was named the Pac-12 Conference Woman of the Year for the 2014–15 academic year.

Synchronized swimming
The synchronized swimming team won three championships in 1980, 1981, and 1984, in the Association of Intercollegiate Athletics for Women.

Notable non-varsity teams
Arizona has three sports in its "Cactus Tier", an elevated level of intercollegiate club competition: ice hockey, lacrosse, and rugby.

Men's ice hockey
The men's ice hockey team was established in 1979 by Head Coach and General Manager Leo Golembiewski as a Division-1 non-varsity hockey team, the team was originally known as the Arizona IceCats. The team was one of the founding programs of the American Collegiate Hockey Association (ACHA) in 1991; and competes as an independent program at the ACHA Division I level.

The team has played at the 7,000-seat Tucson Convention Center, affectionately known as "The Madhouse on Main Street," since the 1980–81 season and are consistently one of the university's top draws with an average attendance of 3,000 fans per game.

Coach Golembiewski retired after 32 seasons as coach and general manager of the team at the conclusion of the 2010–2011 season. Golembiewski compiled a record of 634–217–23, in addition the IceCats won a National Tournament in 1985 and appeared in the National Tournament twenty-one straight seasons prior to 2004, including in eight Final Fours ('84, '86, '87, '88, '91, '93, '94, '97).

The program was reorganized in 2011 under new head coach Sean Hogan. The team changed its name to the university's official 'Wildcats' name and changed the managerial structure in the whole organization. The new Wildcat hockey team is organized under the auspices of the Campus Recreation Department and began receiving increased financial backing from the university, which they have never had in their history under former Head Coach and General Manager Leo Golembiewski.

For the majority of the program's existence, the ice hockey team has competed independent of a conference. The IceCats were originally part of the Intercollegiate Pacific Conference, and later Pacific Hockey Conference, from 1980 until the formation of the ACHA in 1991. Beginning in the 2013–14 season, the team will join the newly formed Western Collegiate Hockey League (WCHL). The new conference will be made of six member teams, including rival Arizona State.

The Wildcats won the 2018–2019 WCHL Championship

Men's lacrosse
The lacrosse team currently competes in the Men's Collegiate Lacrosse Association (MCLA) at the MCLA Division I level in the Southwestern Lacrosse Conference. Lacrosse at U of A has existed since the mid-sixties, and is saturated with a rich tradition of success. In the 1960s, Arizona was a Division I Varsity program, coached by the legendary Carl Runk, an Arizona graduate and football player. In 1998, Carl retired after twenty-eight years at Towson University in Maryland. The most well known player to graduate from that era was Geraldo Rivera, who played goalie. During that Varsity era, the team rose as high as number 3 in the Nation.

The Wildcats have claimed only one Conference Title, occurring in 1990. In 1997, the Wildcats were ranked Number 1 heading into the National Tournament but were upset early by Brigham Young University in the second round of the Tournament. Coach Adam Hopkins, of New York Institute of Technology, was elevated to the top spot and the Tradition continued. Following the 2003 season, Hopkins left and his assistant Ken Broschart was moved into the head coaching position. Broschart brought in Matt Hunter, and the following year Tim Spruyt as the NYIT pipeline continued. Hopkins, Broschart, and Hunter were all All Americans while at NYIT. In 2013, Derek Pedrick was named the U of A head coach. Pedrick was previously the head coach at NCAA Division II Notre Dame de Namur University, and held assistant gigs at Siena College in upstate New York and the College of Wooster in Ohio.

Rugby
Founded in 1969, the University of Arizona rugby program plays in the PAC Rugby Conference against its conference rivals such as Arizona State and Utah. The Wildcats were led by head coach Dave Sitton from 1979 to 2013, who served as a board member of USA Rugby, and also worked as a rugby broadcaster for ESPN and Fox.

The Wildcats have become one of the most successful college rugby programs in the country. The Wildcats reached the quarterfinals of the 2010 national collegiate rugby championships. The Wildcats reached the playoffs in 2013, but lost in an upset to Long Beach. The Wildcats reached the D1-AA national playoffs in 2014, where they defeated Long Beach State, Stanford, and Bowling Green, but ultimately lost to Central Florida in the final.

The Wildcats have a successful rugby sevens program. Arizona has regularly reached the quarterfinals of the Collegiate Rugby Championship (CRC), the highest profile college rugby competition in the U.S., and the Wildcats finished second at the 2012 CRC. The CRC is played every June in Philadelphia and is broadcast live on NBC. Arizona's best known rugby players include Trevor Brady, who holds the record for the longest successful kick and most points in school history, Peter Tiberio and Brett Thompson, who play for the U.S. national rugby team.

Competition cheerleading 
Developed in 2014 and founded in 2015, the CO-ED competition cheerleading team was created to give individuals who participated in 4 person stunt groups and competitions a chance to represent the school. The team competes at national levels at the NCA national college competition in Daytona Florida, the USA national college competition in Anaheim California, and more. In 2020, the team placed 2nd in the Virtual Daytona competition and won 1st in the virtual national college classic competition. They have also won the club sport of the year award for the UofA two years in a row, as well as their coach Nicole Dudas receiving the club sports coach of the year award in 2021. The group does many fundraising activities and community service as well.

The team is separate from the sideline team seen at football games, as they focus more on competing at a national level. In a very short amount of time, the organization has grown from being a tier 3 club sport, to a tier one team, a NCA affiliated cheer team, and a national placing team in competitions.

Championships

NCAA team championships

Arizona has won 19 NCAA team national championships.
 Men's (7)
 Baseball (4): 1976, 1980, 1986, 2012
 Basketball (1): 1997
 Golf (1): 1992
 Swimming (1): 2008
 Women's (12)
 Golf (3): 1996, 2000, 2018
 Softball (8): 1991, 1993, 1994, 1996, 1997, 2001, 2006, 2007
 Swimming (1): 2008
 see also:
 Pac-12 Conference NCAA championships
 List of NCAA schools with the most NCAA Division I championships

Results

† Won sudden-death playoff

NCAA individual championships
Arizona has won 177 NCAA individual national championships.

Notable athletic venues
 McKale Center, opened in 1973, is currently used by men's and women's basketball, women's gymnastics, and women's volleyball. The official capacity has changed often. The largest crowd to see a game in McKale was 15,176 in 1976 for a game against the University of New Mexico, a main rival during that period. In 2000, the floor in McKale was dubbed Lute Olson Court, for the basketball program's winningest coach. During a memorial service in 2001 for Lute's wife, Bobbi, who died earlier that year after a battle with ovarian cancer, the floor was renamed Lute and Bobbi Olson Court. In addition to the playing surface, McKale Center is host to the offices of the UA athletic department. McKale Center is named after J.F. Pop McKale, who was athletic director and coach from 1914 through 1957.
 Arizona Stadium, built in 1928, seats over 56,000 patrons. It's the home for the University of Arizona Wildcats football team, and has also been used for university graduations. The bermuda grass turf taken from the local Tucson National Golf Club was removed following the 2012 season and replaced with artificial turf. Arizona football's home record is 258–139–12. The largest crowd ever in Arizona Stadium was 59,920 in 1996 for a game against Arizona State University.
 Jerry Kindall Field at Frank Sancet Stadium hosted baseball games until the 2011 season; games are now played at Hi Corbett Field.
 Rita Hillenbrand Memorial Stadium hosts softball games.
 Lanelle Robson Tennis Center hosts men's and women's tennis matches.
 The Tucson Convention Center ("The Madhouse on Main St.") hosts hockey games.

Wildcats in the Olympics
In addition to the successful athletic program, Arizona has produced 122 Olympians making 187 appearances between 1952 through 2021. 

Notable Wildcat Olympians include Delaney Schnell (women's diving, silver), Amy Van Dyken (women's swimming, gold),  Josh Green (men's basketball, bronze), Jennie Finch (softball, gold and silver), Andre Iguodala (men's basketball, gold), Amanda Beard (women's swimming, multiple medals), and Richard Jefferson (men's basketball, bronze).

Traditions
 At the beginning of each school year, freshmen repaint the "A" on "A" Mountain, a Tucson and Wildcat landmark just west of campus.
 One of the two bells rescued from the USS Arizona after the attack on Pearl Harbor has a permanent home in the clock tower of the Student Union Memorial Center on campus. The bell first arrived on campus in July 1946. The bell is rung seven times on the third Wednesday of every month at 12:07 p.m. to honor the achievements of the UA, as well as after football victories over all schools located outside of Arizona.
 The University of Arizona marching band, named The Pride of Arizona, played at the halftime of the first Super Bowl. The band plays at most of the university's athletic events.

History of Bear Down, Arizona!
In 1952, Jack K. Lee, an applicant for the UA's band directorship, departed Tucson by air following an interview with UA administration. From his airplane window, Lee observed the huge letters on the roof of the UA gymnasium reading "BEAR DOWN". Inspired, Lee scribbled down what was at first a poem, but later turned into a song. By the time his plane landed, he had virtually finished it. A few weeks later Lee was named the UA band director, and in September 1952, the UA band performed "Bear Down, Arizona!" in public for the first time. Soon thereafter, "Bear Down, Arizona!" became accepted as UA's fight song despite the fact that the Chicago Bears fight song, "Bear Down, Chicago Bears", was introduced in 1941.

History behind the motto Bear Down
The battle cry was created by a popular student athlete, John "Button" Salmon, who was the student body president, as well as the starting quarterback for the Wildcat football team and the catcher for the Wildcat baseball team.

The day before the first game of the 1926 football season, Salmon and three friends were involved in an automobile accident and their vehicle flipped over a ravine. Although Salmon's friends were not injured, Salmon incurred a severe spinal cord injury.

In the aftermath of the accident, football coach Pop McKale visited him in the hospital every day. During McKale's last visit, Salmon's last message to his teammates was, "Tell them...tell the team to bear down." John Salmon died on October 18, 1926.

The following year, the University of Arizona student body approved that "Bear Down" would be the new slogan for all Wildcat athletic teams. In 1939, the Arizona state legislature issued a decree that "Bear Down" would be the exclusive property of the University of Arizona.

References

External links

 

 
College sports in Arizona
Sports in Tucson, Arizona
University of Arizona